Lithuanian Special Archives is an archive in Lithuania for the storage of documents from the period 1940–91. Numerous KGB and Lithuanian SSR Ministry of Interior documents were left in Lithuania after it gained independence from the Soviet Union in 1991, and are now held here. Around 18,000 linear metres of records are stored.

The Special Archives are maintained by the Office of the Chief Archivist of Lithuania, and are collected and stored according to Lithuanian Archives law.

Access to the documents in the archive were the subject of a 2006 Constitutional Court of the Republic of Lithuania case.

References

External links
 

Archives in Lithuania